This list of the Mesozoic life of Montana contains the various prehistoric life-forms whose fossilized remains have been reported from within the US state of Montana and are between 252.17 and 66 million years of age.

A

  †Achelousaurus – type locality for genus
 †Achelousaurus horneri – type locality for species
  †Acheroraptor – type locality for genus
 †Acheroraptor temertyorum – type locality for species
  Acipenser
 †Acipenser eruciferus
  †Acristavus – type locality for genus
 †Acristavus gagslarsoni – type locality for species
 †Acrostichopteris
 †Acrostichopteris longipennis
 †Adiantites
 †Adiantites montanensis
  †Adocus
  †Albanerpeton
 †Albanerpeton nexuosus
  †Albertaceratops
 †Albertaceratops nesmoi
 †Albertatherium
 †Albertatherium primus
  †Albertosaurus
 †Aletridelphys
 †Aletridelphys clemensi – type locality for species
 †Aletridelphys florencae
 †Aletridelphys hatcheri
  †Allocrioceras
 †Allocrioceras annulatum
  †Allosaurus
 †Alostera
 †Alostera saskatchewanensis
  †Alphadon
 †Alphadon attaragos
 †Alphadon halleyi – type locality for species
 †Alphadon marshi
 †Alphadon wilsoni
 †Altacreodus
 †Altacreodus magnus
 †Alzadasaurus – tentative report
 †Alzadites – type locality for genus
 †Alzadites alzadensis – type locality for species
 †Ambilestes
 †Ambilestes cerberoides – or unidentified comparable form
 Amia
 †Amia fragosa
 †Amia uintaensis
 †Amphicoelias
 †Anatotitan
 †Anatotitan copei
 †Anchura – tentative report
  †Ankylosaurus – type locality for genus
 †Ankylosaurus magniventris – type locality for species
 †Anomozamites
 †Aquiladelphis
 †Aquiladelphis incus
 †Aquiladelphis minor
 †Aquilapollenites
 †Aquilapollenites collaris
 †Aquilapollenites conatus
 †Aquilapollenites marmarthensis
 †Aquilapollenites mtchedlishvilii
 †Aquilapollenites quadrilobus
 †Aquilapollenites turbidus
  †Aquilops – type locality for genus
 †Aquilops americanus – type locality for species
 Aralia – or unidentified comparable form
 †Aralia wellingtonia
 †Araliaephyllum
 †Araliaephyllum westonii
 †Araliopsoides
 †Araliopsoides cretacea – or unidentified comparable form
 †Araucarites
 †Araucarites longifolia
 †Arcellites
 †Archaeolamna
 †Archaeolamna kopingensis
 †Archaeotriakis – type locality for genus
 †Archaeotriakis rochelleae – type locality for species
  †Arcticoceras – tentative report
 †Arctocephalites
 †Arctocephalites gracilis – or unidentified comparable form
 †Arctocephalites maculatus – or unidentified comparable form
 †Arctocephalites platynotus – or unidentified comparable form
 †Arctocephalites sawtoothensis
 †Arctocephalites saypoensis
 †Argaliatherium – type locality for genus
 †Argaliatherium robustum – type locality for species
 †Ariadnaesporites
 †Ariadnaesporites fluviatilis – type locality for species
 †Ascarinites – type locality for genus
 †Ascarinites communis – type locality for species
 †Aspideretoides
 †Aspidophyllum – or unidentified comparable form
 †Aspidophyllum trilobatum
 †Asplenium
  Astarte
 †Astarte meeki
 †Astarte morion
 †Astarte packardi – or unidentified comparable form
 †Athrotaxites
 †Athrotaxites berryi – or unidentified comparable form
 †Aublysodon
 †Aublysodon mirandus
 †Austrotindaria
 †Austrotindaria canalensis
 †Austrotindaria svalbardensis
  †Avaceratops – type locality for genus
 †Avaceratops lammersi – type locality for species
 Avicula
  †Avisaurus – type locality for genus
 †Avisaurus archibaldi – type locality for species
 †Avisaurus gloriae – type locality for species
 †Axestemys
 †Axestemys splendida – type locality for species
 Azolla
 †Azolla barbata
 †Azolla circinata – type locality for species
 †Azolla distincta
 †Azolla simplex – type locality for species
 †Azolla spinata – type locality for species
 †Azollopsis – type locality for genus
 †Azollopsis coccoides – type locality for species
 †Azollopsis tomentosa – type locality for species

B

 †Baculatisporites
  †Baculites
 †Baculites asper
 †Baculites codyensis
 †Baculites compressus
 †Baculites mariasensis
 †Baena
 †Baena callosa – type locality for species
 †Baioconodon
 †Baioconodon nordicus – or unidentified comparable form
 †Bakevellia
  †Bambiraptor – type locality for genus
 †Bambiraptor feinbergi – type locality for species
 Barbourula – or unidentified comparable form
  †Basilemys
 †Basilemys sinuosa – type locality for species
 †Batodon
 †Batodon tenuis
 †Belfria – type locality for genus
 †Belfria microphylla – type locality for species
  †Belonostomus
 †Belonostomus longirostris
 †Bernissartia
 †Biretisporites
 †Biretisporites deltoideus
 †Borealosuchus
 †Borealosuchus sternbergii
 †Boremys
 †Boremys pulchra
 †Borissiakoceras
 †Borissiakoceras orbiculatum
 Brachaelurus
 †Brachaelurus estesi
  †Brachyceratops – type locality for genus
 †Brachyceratops montanensis – type locality for species
  †Brachychampsa – type locality for genus
 †Brachychampsa montana – type locality for species
 †Brachychampsa montanus
  †Brachylophosaurus
 †Brachylophosaurus canadensis – type locality for species
 †Buccinammonites – type locality for genus
 †Buccinammonites minimus – type locality for species

C

  †Camarasaurus
 Campeloma
 †Camptonectes
 †Camptonectes platessiformis
 †Camptonectes stygius
  Carcharias
 †Cardiaster
 †Cardiaster curtus
 †Carinalestes – type locality for genus
 †Carinalestes murensis – type locality for species
 †Cedrobaena
 †Cedrobaena brinkman
 †Celastrophyllum – or unidentified comparable form
  †Centrosaurus
  †Cerasinops – type locality for genus
 †Cerasinops hodgskissi – type locality for species
  †Ceratodus
 †Ceratodus frazieri
 †Ceratodus guentheri – or unidentified comparable form
 †Ceratops – type locality for genus
 †Ceratops montanus – type locality for species
 †Cerberophis – type locality for genus
 †Cerberophis robustus – type locality for species
 †Cercomya
 †Cercomya punctata
 †Chamops
 †Chamops segnis
  †Champsosaurus
 †Champsosaurus natator
  †Chasmosaurus – or unidentified comparable form
 Chiloscyllium
 †Chiloscyllium missouriensis – type locality for species
  †Chirostenotes
 †Chirostenotes elegans
 Chlamys
 †Chondroceras
 †Chondroceras allani – or unidentified comparable form
 †Chondroceras oblatum
 †Cimexomys
 †Cimexomys minor
 †Cimolestes
 †Cimolestes incisus
 †Cimolestes stirtoni
 †Cimoliasaurus
 †Cimolodon
 †Cimolodon nitidus
  †Cimolomys
 †Cimolomys clarki – type locality for species
 †Cimolomys gracilis
 †Cimolopteryx
 †Cimolopteryx maxima
 †Cinnamomoides
  Cladophlebis
 †Cladophlebis alberta
 †Cladophlebis constricta
 †Cladophlebis heterophylla
 †Cladophlebis inclinata
 †Cladophlebis oblongifolia
 †Cladophlebis oerstedi
 †Cladophlebis virginiensis
 †Claosaurus
 †Claraia
 †Claraia aurita
 †Claraia clarai
 †Claraia mulleri
 †Claraia stachei
  †Clidastes
 †Clioscaphites
 †Clioscaphites vermiformis
 †Cobbanites
 †Coelostylina
 †Colpodontosaurus
 †Colpodontosaurus cracens
 †Componocancer
 †Componocancer roberti
 †Compsemys
 †Compsemys victa
 †Coniophis
 †Coniophis precedens
 †Coniopteris
 †Coniopteris bella – or unidentified comparable form
 †Coniopteris hymenophylloides
 †Coniopteris simplex
 †Continuoolithus
 †Continuoolithus canadensis
 †Contogenys – type locality for genus
 †Contogenys sloani – type locality for species
 †Coriops
 †Coriops amnicolus
 †Corviconodon
 †Corviconodon montanensis – type locality for species
  †Corythosaurus
 †Corythosaurus casuarius
 Crassatella
 †Cremnoceramus
 †Cremnoceramus deformis
  †Cretolamna
 †Cretolamna appendiculata
 †Cretorectolobus – type locality for genus
 †Cretorectolobus olsoni – type locality for species
 †Crocodilus
 †Crocodilus humilis
 †Cryptometoicoceras
 †Cryptometoicoceras mite
 Cucullaea
 †Cucullaea haguei
 †Cucullaea rockymontana
 †Cyathidites
 †Cyathidites minor
 †Cycadolepis
 †Cycadopites
 †Cycadopites fragilis
 †Cyclurus
 †Cyclurus fragosus

D

  †Daspletosaurus
 †Daspletosaurus horneri – type locality for species
 †Deinodon – type locality for genus
 †Deinodon horridus – type locality for species
  †Deinonychus – type locality for genus
 †Deinonychus antirrhopus – type locality for species
  †Deinosuchus – type locality for genus
 †Deinosuchus rugosus – type locality for species
 †Deltoidospora
 †Deltoidospora cascadensis – type locality for species
 †Deltoidospora diaphana
 †Deltoidospora hallii – type locality for species
 Dentalium
 †Derrisemys
 †Derrisemys sterea
 †Diclonius
 †Dictyothykalos
  †Didelphodon
 †Didelphodon vorax
 †Didymoceras
 †Didymoceras cheyennense
 †Didymoceras nebrascense
 †Didymoceras stevensoni
 †Diettertia
 †Diettertia montanensis
  †Diplodocus
 †Doratodon – or unidentified comparable form
 †Dromaeosaurus
 †Dromaeosaurus albertensis
 †Dryophyllum – report made of unidentified related form or using admittedly obsolete nomenclature
 †Dryophyllum subfalcatum
 †Dunveganoceras
 †Dunveganoceras albertense
 †Dunveganoceras parvum – type locality for species
 †Dunveganoceras pondi
 †Dyadonapites
 †Dyadonapites reticulatus
  †Dyoplosaurus
 †Dyoplosaurus acutosquameus

E

 †Echinatisporis
 †Ectocentrocristus
 †Ectocentrocristus foxi – type locality for species
 †Ectoconodon
 †Ectoconodon montanensis – type locality for species
  †Edgarosaurus
 †Edgarosaurus muddi
  †Edmontonia
 †Edmontonia longiceps
 †Edmontonia rugosidens – type locality for species
 †Edmontosaurus
  †Edmontosaurus annectens
  †Einiosaurus – type locality for genus
 †Einiosaurus procurvicornis – type locality for species
 †Elasmodus
 †Elasmodus greenoughi – or unidentified comparable form
 †Emarginachelys – type locality for genus
 †Emarginachelys cretacea – type locality for species
 †Entolioides
 †Entolioides utahensis
 †Eodelphis
 †Eopelobates – or unidentified comparable form
  †Equisetum
 †Equisetum cascadensis – type locality for species
 †Equisetum laterale
 †Equisetum montanensis
 †Erdtmanipollis
 †Erdtmanipollis procumbentiformis
 †Essonodon – type locality for genus
 †Essonodon browni – type locality for species
 †Eubaena
 †Eubaena cephalica
 †Eucrossorhinus
 †Eucrossorhinus microcuspidatus – type locality for species
 †Eumorphotis
 †Eumorphotis amplicostata – type locality for species
 †Eumorphotis ericius – or unidentified comparable form
 †Eumorphotis multiformis
 †Euomphaloceras
 †Euomphaloceras septemseriatum
  †Euoplocephalus
 †Euoplocephalus tutus
 †Eutrephoceras
 †Eutrephoceras montanensis – type locality for species
  †Exiteloceras
 †Exiteloceras jenneyi
 †Exogyra
 †Exogyra columbella
 †Exostinus
 †Exostinus lancensis

F

 †Falepetrus
 †Falepetrus barwini
 Ficus – or unidentified comparable form
 †Ficus ovatifolia
 †Fletcherithyris – report made of unidentified related form or using admittedly obsolete nomenclature
 †Fletcherithyris margaritovi
 †Foraminisporis
 †Foraminisporis undulates

G

 †Gastopoda
 †Gervillia
 †Gervillia ussurica – or unidentified comparable form
 †Gilmoremys
 †Gilmoremys lancensis
  Ginkgo
 †Ginkgo pluripartita
 †Ginkgoites
 †Ginkgoites cascadensis
 †Ginkgoites pluripartita
 †Glasbius
 †Glasbius twitchelli – type locality for species
 †Glishades – type locality for genus
 †Glishades ericksoni – type locality for species
 †Glyptops
 †Glyptops pervicax – type locality for species
  Glyptostrobus – or unidentified comparable form
  †Gobiconodon – type locality for genus
 †Gobiconodon ostromi – type locality for species
 †Goniobasis
 †Goniobasis subtortuosa
  †Gorgosaurus
 †Gorgosaurus libratus – type locality for species
 †Grammatodon
 †Grewipollenites
 †Grewipollenites radiatus
  †Gryphaea
 †Gryphaea – type locality for species – informal
 †Gryphaea impressimarginata
  †Gryposaurus
 †Gryposaurus latidens – type locality for species
 †Gryposaurus notabilis
 †Gypsonictops
 †Gypsonictops hypoconus
 †Gypsonictops illuminatus
 †Gypsonictops lewisi – type locality for species
 Gyrodes
 †Gyrodes conradi

H

 †Habrosaurus
 †Habrosaurus dilatus
 †Hadrosaurus
 †Hadrosaurus breviceps – type locality for species
 †Hadrosaurus paucidens – type locality for species
 †Hamites
 †Hamites cimarronensis
 †Haptosphenus
 †Haptosphenus placodon
 †Hausmannia
 †Hausmannia fisheri
 †Hausmannia montanensis
 †Helopanoplia
 †Helopanoplia distincta
  †Hesperornis
 †Hesperornis montana – type locality for species
 †Heteropecten – tentative report
 †Holocrinus
 †Hoploscaphites
 †Hoploscaphites macer – type locality for species
 †Hummelichelys
 †Hummelichelys beecheri
 †Hummelichelys foveatus – type locality for species
  †Hybodus
 †Hybodus montanensis – type locality for species
 †Hybodus storeri – type locality for species
  †Hypacrosaurus
 †Hypacrosaurus stebingeri – type locality for species
 †Hypotodus
 †Hypotodus grandis – type locality for species

I

 †Idiohamites
 †Idiohamites bispinosus – type locality for species
 †Idiohamites pulchellus – type locality for species
  †Inoceramus
 †Inoceramus arnoldi
 †Inoceramus canaliculatus
 †Inoceramus cancellatus
 †Inoceramus cardissoides - or unidentified loosely related form
 †Inoceramus cordiformis – or unidentified comparable form
 †Inoceramus erectus
 †Inoceramus fragilis – or unidentified related form
 †Inoceramus frechi – or unidentified comparable form
 †Inoceramus gibbosus
 †Inoceramus gilli – type locality for species
 †Inoceramus glacierensis – type locality for species
 †Inoceramus koeneni
 †Inoceramus latisulcatus – or unidentified comparable form
 †Inoceramus lesginensis
 †Inoceramus lingua – or unidentified comparable form
 †Inoceramus lundbreckensis
 †Inoceramus sokolovi – type locality for species
 †Inoceramus undabundus
 †Inoceramus walterdorfensis
 †Iqualadelphis
 †Iqualadelphis lactea
  †Ischyodus
 †Ischyodus bifurcatus
 †Ischyrhiza
 †Ischyrhiza avonicola
 †Ischyrhiza mira
 †Isocyprina – or unidentified comparable form
 †Isocyprina iddingsi

J

  †Judiceratops – type locality for genus
 †Judiceratops tigris – type locality for species
 †Judithemys
 †Judithemys backmani

K

 †Kastanoceras – type locality for genus
 †Kastanoceras spiniger – type locality for species
 †Klukia
 †Klukia canadensis
  †Kritosaurus
 †Kritosaurus breviceps – or unidentified comparable form
 †Krokolithes

L

 †Labrodioctes – type locality for genus
 †Labrodioctes montanensis – type locality for species
 †Laevigatosporites
 †Laevigatosporites haardtii
  †Lepidotes
 †Lepidotes haydeni – type locality for species
 †Lepidotes occidentalis – type locality for species
 †Lepismatina – report made of unidentified related form or using admittedly obsolete nomenclature
 †Lepismatina mansfieldi
  Lepisosteus
 †Lepisosteus occidentalis
 †Leptalestes
 †Leptalestes cooki
 †Leptalestes krejcii
 †Leptalestes prokrejcii
 †Leptalestes toevsi – type locality for species
  †Leptoceratops
 †Leptoceratops gracilis
 †Leptochamops
 †Leptochamops denticulatus
 †Leptochondria
 †Leptochondria occidanea
 †Leptopecopites
 †Leptopecopites pocockii
  †Leptorhynchos – tentative report
 †Lesterwardia – type locality for genus
 †Lesterwardia palustris – type locality for species
 †Liliacidites
 †Lingula
 †Lingularia
 †Lingularia borealis
 †Lioplacodes
 †Lioplacodes judithensis
 †Lioplacodes williamsi
 †Liostrea
 †Liostrea strigilecula
 †Lisserpeton – type locality for genus
 †Lisserpeton atlantes
 †Lisserpeton bairdi – type locality for species
 †Lonchidion
 †Lonchidion selachos
  Lopha
 †Lucina
  Lunatia
 †Lunatia dakotensis – or unidentified comparable form
 †Lygobius – type locality for genus
 †Lygobius knowltoni – type locality for species

M

 †Magadiceramus
 †Magadiceramus soukupi
 †Magnuviator – type locality for genus
 †Magnuviator ovimonsensis – type locality for species
  †Maiasaura – type locality for genus
 †Maiasaura peeblesorum – type locality for species
 †Marchantiolites
 †Marchantiolites blairmorensis
 †Marmarthia
 †Marmarthia trivialis
  †Medusaceratops – type locality for genus
 †Medusaceratops lokii – type locality for species
 †Meleagrinella
 †Meleagrinella curta
 †Melvius – type locality for genus
 †Melvius thomasi – type locality for species
  †Meniscoessus
 †Meniscoessus major
 †Meniscoessus robustus – type locality for species
 †Meniscognathus
 †Meniscognathus altmani
  †Mercuriceratops – type locality for genus
 †Mercuriceratops gemini – type locality for species
 †Mesodma
 †Mesodma formosa
 †Mesodma hensleighi
 †Mesodma primaeva
 †Mesodma thompsoni
 †Metoicoceras
 †Metoicoceras geslinianum
 †Metoicoceras mosbyense – type locality for species
 †Metoicoceras muelleri
 †Metzgeriites
 †Metzgeriites montanensis – type locality for species
 †Micrabacia
 †Micrabacia radiata
 †Microsulcatoceras – type locality for genus
 †Microsulcatoceras puzosiiforme – type locality for species
  †Microvenator – type locality for genus
 †Microvenator celer – type locality for species
 †Minerisporites
 †Minerisporites pseudorichardsonii
 †Miocidaris
  †Modiolus
 †Modiolus rosii
 †Monoclonius – type locality for genus
 †Monoclonius crassus – type locality for species
 †Monoclonius recurvicornis – type locality for species
 †Monoclonius sphenocerus – type locality for species
 †Monosulcites
 †Monosulcites riparius
 †Montanalestes
 †Montanalestes keeblerorum
  †Montanazhdarcho – type locality for genus
 †Montanazhdarcho minor – type locality for species
 †Montania – type locality for genus
 †Montania glandulosa – type locality for species
  †Montanoceratops
 †Montanoceratops cerorhynchus – type locality for species
 †Montanoolithus – type locality for genus
 †Montanoolithus strongorum – type locality for species
 †Moremanoceras
 †Moremanoceras costatum
 †Moremanoceras montanaense – type locality for species
 †Moremanoceras straini
  †Mosasaurus
 †Mosasaurus missouriensis
 †Myalina
 †Myalina postcarbonica
 †Myledaphus
 †Myledaphus bipartitus
  †Mytilus

N

 †Nannometoicoceras
 †Nannometoicoceras nanos – type locality for species
  †Nanotyrannus
 †Nanotyrannus lancensis – type locality for species
 †Naomichelys – type locality for genus
 †Naomichelys speciosa – type locality for species
 †Necrocarcinus
 †Nelumbo
 †Nelumbo peltata – type locality for species
 †Neocardioceras
 †Neocardioceras juddii
 †Neocardioceras minutum
 †Neogastroplites
 †Neogastroplites haasi
 †Neoplagiaulax
 †Neoplagiaulax burgessi – type locality for species
 †Neoschizodus
 †Neurankylus – type locality for genus
 †Neurankylus eximius – type locality for species
 †Nezpercius – type locality for genus
 †Nezpercius dodsoni – type locality for species
 †Nidimys – type locality for genus
 †Nidimys occultus – type locality for species
 †Nilsonia
 †Nilsonia compta – or unidentified comparable form
  †Normannites – tentative report
 †Normannites crickmayi – or unidentified comparable form
 †Nortedelphys – type locality for genus
 †Nortedelphys jasoni – type locality for species
 †Nortedelphys minimus – type locality for species
  †Notogoneus
 †Notogoneus montananesis – type locality for species
 †Notogoneus montenensis – type locality for species
   Nucula
 †Nymphaeites

O

 †Obamadon – type locality for genus
 †Obamadon gracilis – type locality for species
 †Odaxosaurus
 †Odaxosaurus piger
 Odontaspis
 †Odontaspis sanguinei – type locality for species
 †Oklatheridium
 †Oklatheridium wiblei – type locality for species
 †Onchosaurus
 †Onchosaurus avonicolus
  †Oohkotokia – type locality for genus
 †Oohkotokia horneri – type locality for species
 †Ophioglypha
 †Ophioglypha bridgerensis
 †Ophiomorpha
 †Opisthotriton
 †Opisthotriton kayi
 †Orbicoelia
  †Ornithomimus
 †Ornithomimus grandis – type locality for species
 †Ornithomimus tenuis – type locality for species
  †Orodromeus – type locality for genus
 †Orodromeus makelai – type locality for species
  †Oryctodromeus – type locality for genus
 †Oryctodromeus cubicularis – type locality for species
 Ostrea
 †Oxybeloceras
 †Oxybeloceras crassum
 †Oxytoma
 †Oxytoma mclearni

P

  †Pachycephalosaurus – type locality for genus
 †Pachycephalosaurus wyomingensis – type locality for species
  †Pagiophyllum
  †Palaeobatrachus
 †Palaeobatrachus occidentalis
 †Palaeolabrus
 †Palaeolabrus montanensis
 †Palaeosaniwa
 †Palaeosaniwa canadensis
  †Palaeoscincus – type locality for genus
 †Palaeoscincus costatus – type locality for species
 †Palatobaena
 †Palatobaena bairdi
 †Paleopsephurus – type locality for genus
 †Paleopsephurus wilsoni – type locality for species
 †Paleoungulatum – type locality for genus
 †Paleoungulatum hooleyi – type locality for species
  †Panoplosaurus
 †Pappotherium
 †Pappotherium pattersoni
 †Parachondroceras
 †Parachondroceras andrewsi
 †Parachondroceras filicostatum
 †Paracimexomys
 †Paracimexomys judithae – type locality for species
 †Paracimexomys magnus – type locality for species
 †Paracimexomys priscus
 †Paracimexomys propriscus – type locality for species
 †Paracimexomys robisoni – or unidentified comparable form
 †Paraderma
 †Paraderma bogerti
 †Paralbula
 †Paralbula casei
 †Paramacellodus – or unidentified comparable form
 †Paramacellodus keebleri – type locality for species
 †Paranecturus – type locality for genus
 †Paranecturus garbanii – type locality for species
 †Paranyctoides
 †Paranyctoides maleficus
  †Parapuzosia
 †Parapuzosia bradyi – type locality for species
 †Parasaniwa
 †Parasaniwa wyomingensis
 †Parataxodium
 †Parazolla – type locality for genus
 †Parazolla heterotricha – type locality for species
 †Parazollopsis – type locality for genus
 †Parazollopsis cascadensis – type locality for species
  †Paronychodon
 †Paronychodon lacustris
  †Pectinodon – or unidentified comparable form
 †Pediomys
 †Pediomys elegans
 †Peneteius – type locality for genus
 †Peneteius aquilonius – type locality for species
 †Penetetrapites
 †Penetetrapites inconspicuous
 †Pentacrinus
 †Pentacrinus asteriscus
 †Permophorus
 †Permophorus triassicus
 †Phelopteria
  Pholadomya
 †Pholadomya inaequiplicatus
 †Pholadomya kingi
  Physa
 †Physa copei – or unidentified comparable form
 †Piceoerpeton
 †Piceoerpeton naylori – type locality for species
 †Piksi – type locality for genus
 †Piksi barbarulna – type locality for species
  †Pinna
 †Pinna kingi
 †Pistia
 †Pistia corrugata
 †Pityocladus
 †Pityophyllum
 †Pityophyllum lindstromi
 †Pityosporites
 †Pityosporites constrictus
 †Placunopsis
 †Plastomenus
 †Plastomenus costatus
 †Platacodon
 †Platacodon nanus
 †Platanophyllum
 †Plesiacanthoceras
 †Plesiacanthoceras wyomingense
 †Plesiacanthoceratoides
 †Plesiacanthoceratoides alzadense
 †Plesiobaena
 †Plesiobaena antiqua
 †Pleuromya
 †Pleuromya oblongata – or unidentified comparable form
 †Pleuromya subcompressa
  †Pleuronautilus
 †Pleuronectites – tentative report
 †Plicatolamna
 †Plicatolamna arcuata
 †Podozamites
 †Podozamites lanceolatus
 †Polycingulatisporites
 †Polycingulatisporites reduncus
  †Prenoceratops – type locality for genus
 †Prenoceratops pieganensis – type locality for species
 †Prismatoolithus
 †Prismatoolithus hirschi – type locality for species
 †Prismatoolithus levis
 †Pristinuspollenites
 †Pristinuspollenites microsaccus
 †Proamphiuma
 †Proamphiuma cretacea
 †Procerberus
 †Prodesmodon
 †Prodesmodon copei
 †Promyalina
 †Promyalina spathi – type locality for species
  †Prosaurolophus
 †Prosaurolophus blackfeetensis – type locality for species
 †Protalphadon
 †Protalphadon foxi – type locality for species
 †Protalphadon lulli
 †Protexanites
 †Protocaiman
 †Protocardia
 †Protocardia schucherti
 †Protolambda
 †Protolambda mcgilli – type locality for species
 †Protolamna
 †Protolamna sokolovi
 †Protophyllocladus
 †Protophyllocladus subintegrifolius
 †Protophyllum – or unidentified comparable form
 †Protoplatyrhina – type locality for genus
 †Protoplatyrhina renae – type locality for species
 †Protoscaphirhynchus – type locality for genus
 †Protoscaphirhynchus squamosus – type locality for species
  †Protungulatum
 †Protungulatum coombsi – type locality for species
 †Protungulatum gorgun
 †Psammorhynchus
 †Psammorhynchus longipinnis – type locality for species
 †Pseudocycas
 †Pseudocycas douglasii – type locality for species
 †Pseudohypolophus
  †Pseudomelania
 †Pseudomelania hendricksoni
  †Pteria – tentative report
 †Pteria ussurica – or unidentified comparable form
 †Pteropelyx – type locality for genus
 †Pteropelyx grallipes – type locality for species
 †Ptychotrygon
 †Ptychotrygon blainensis – type locality for species
 †Ptychotrygon hooveri
 †Ptychotrygon triangularis
  Pycnodonte

Q

 †Quenstedtia – tentative report
 Quercus – report made of unidentified related form or using admittedly obsolete nomenclature
 †Quercus stantoni
  †Quetzalcoatlus – or unidentified comparable form

R

 †Retinovena – type locality for genus
 †Retinovena fluvialis – type locality for species
 †Retitricolpites
 †Retitricolpites microreticulatus
 Rhabdocolpus
 †Rhaeboceras
 †Rhaeboceras burkholderi – type locality for species
 †Rhaeboceras cedarense – type locality for species
 †Rhaeboceras coloradoense
 †Rhaeboceras halli
 †Rhaeboceras subglobosum
 †Rhamnus – report made of unidentified related form or using admittedly obsolete nomenclature
 †Rhamnus cleburni
  †Richardoestesia
 †Richardoestesia gilmorei
 †Richardoestesia isosceles
 †Rostellites – tentative report
  †Rubeosaurus
 †Rubeosaurus ovatus – type locality for species
 †Rugocaudia – type locality for genus
 †Rugocaudia cooneyi – type locality for species

S

  †Sagenopteris
 †Sagenopteris elliptica
 †Sagenopteris mclearni
 †Sagenopteris williamsii
  †Sauropelta – type locality for genus
 †Sauropelta edwardsorum – type locality for species
  †Saurornitholestes
 †Saurornitholestes langstoni
 †Scabrastephanocolpites
 †Scabrastephanocolpites lepidus
 †Scapherpeton
 †Scapherpeton tectum
 †Scaphites
 †Scaphites impendicostatus
 †Scaphites mariasensis
 †Scaphites preventricosus
 †Scaphites ventricosus
 †Scaphotrigonia
 †Scaphotrigonia naviformis
 †Schizolepis
 †Schizosporis
 †Schizosporis laevigatus
 †Sciponoceras
 †Sciponoceras gracile
 †Scollardius
 †Scollardius propalaeoryctes
  †Scolosaurus
 †Scolosaurus cutleri
 †Scotiophryne – type locality for genus
 †Scotiophryne pustulosa – type locality for species
  †Sequoia
 †Siberiapollis
 †Siberiapollis montanensis
 †Sohlites
 †Sohlites spinosus
 †Solenoceras
 †Solenoceras bearpawense
 †Spalacotheridium
 †Spalacotheridium mckennai
 Sphaerium
 †Sphaerium planum
 †Sphaerotholus
 †Sphaerotholus buchholtzae – type locality for species
 †Sphenopteris
 †Sphenopteris brulensis
 †Sphenopteris geopperti
 †Sphenopteris goepperti
 †Sphenopteris latiloba
 †Sphenopteris mclearni
  †Spheroolithus
 †Spheroolithus albertensis
 †Spheroolithus choteauensis – type locality for species
 †Spheroolithus maiasauroides
  †Spiclypeus – type locality for genus
 †Spiclypeus shipporum – type locality for species
 †Spiriferina – report made of unidentified related form or using admittedly obsolete nomenclature
 †Sporonites
 †Sporonites montanensis – type locality for species
 Squalicorax
 †Squalicorax kaupi
 †Squalicorax pristodontus
 †Squatirhina
 †Squatirhina americana
 †Stantoniella – type locality for genus
 †Stantoniella cretacea – type locality for species
  †Stegoceras
 †Stegoceras validum
  †Stegosaurus
 †Stemmatoceras
 †Stemmatoceras albertense – or unidentified related form
 †Stemmatoceras arcicostum
 †Stemmatoceras palliseri – or unidentified related form
 †Stygiochelys – type locality for genus
 †Stygiochelys estesi – type locality for species
 †Sumitomoceras
  †Suuwassea – type locality for genus
 †Suuwassea emilieae – type locality for species
 †Symmetrodontoides
 †Symmetrodontoides canadensis
 †Synechodus
 †Synechodus andersoni – type locality for species
 †Synechodus striatus – type locality for species

T

 †Tancredia
 †Tancredia inornata – or unidentified comparable form
 †Tarrantoceras
 †Tarrantoceras cuspidum
 †Tatankacephalus – type locality for genus
 †Tatankacephalus cooneyorum – type locality for species
 †Taxodiaceaepollenites
 †Taxodiaceaepollenites hiatus
  †Tenontosaurus – type locality for genus
 †Tenontosaurus tilletti – type locality for species
  †Terminonaris – type locality for genus
 †Terminonaris browni – type locality for species
 †Terminonaris robusta – type locality for species
 †Thalassomedon – type locality for genus
 †Thalassomedon hanningtoni – type locality for species
  †Thescelosaurus
 †Thescelosaurus garbanii – type locality for species
 †Thescelosaurus neglectus
 †Thescelus
 †Thescelus insiliens
 †Thlaeodon – tentative report
 †Todisporites
 †Todisporites dubius – or unidentified comparable form
 †Toxolophosaurus – type locality for genus
 †Toxolophosaurus cloudi – type locality for species
  †Trachodon – type locality for genus
 †Trachodon altidens
 †Trachodon marginatus
 †Trachodon mirabilis – type locality for species
 †Trachytriton
 †Trachytriton – type locality for species – informal
  †Triceratops
 †Triceratops horridus
 †Triceratops maximus – type locality for species
 †Triceratops prorsus
  †Trigonia
 †Trigonia conradi – or unidentified comparable form
 †Trigonia montanaensis
 †Trigonia trafalgarensis – or unidentified comparable form
 †Trigonocallista
 †Trigonocallista orbiculata
 Trionyx
 †Triprismatoolithus – type locality for genus
 †Triprismatoolithus stephensi – type locality for species
 †Trochicola
 †Trochicola scollardiana
 †Trochodendroides
  †Troodon – type locality for genus
 †Troodon formosus – type locality for species
 †Tubercuoolithus – type locality for genus
 †Tubercuoolithus tetonensis – type locality for species
 †Tubulifloridites
 †Tubulifloridites aedicula
 †Tullochelys
 †Tullochelys montana
 †Turgidodon
 †Turgidodon praesagus
 †Turgidodon rhaister
 †Turgidodon russelli
  Turritella
  †Tylosaurus
 †Tylosaurus proriger
  †Tyrannosaurus – type locality for genus
 †Tyrannosaurus rex – type locality for species

U

 †Ugrosaurus – type locality for genus
 †Ugrosaurus olsoni – type locality for species
 Unio
 †Unionites
 †Unionites fassaensis

V

 †Valenopsalis
 †Valenopsalis joyneri
 Valvata – tentative report
 †Valvata montanensis
 †Varalphadon
 †Varalphadon wahweapensis
 †Veniella
 Vitis – report made of unidentified related form or using admittedly obsolete nomenclature
 †Vitis stantoni
 Viviparus
 †Viviparus couesii
  †Volviceramus
 †Volviceramus exogyroides
 †Volviceramus involutus

W

 †Weediaphyllum – type locality for genus
 †Weediaphyllum parkensis – type locality for species
 †Weltrichia
 †Wodehousia
 †Wodehousia spinata
 †Woodwardia – report made of unidentified related form or using admittedly obsolete nomenclature
 †Woodwardia crenata

X

 †Xenocephalites – tentative report
  Xenophora

Y

 †Yezoites
 †Yezoites delicatulus

Z

  †Zamites
 †Zamites arcticus
  †Zapsalis – or unidentified comparable form
 †Zephyrosaurus – type locality for genus
 †Zephyrosaurus schaffi – type locality for species
 †Zlivisporis
 †Zlivisporis cenomanianus
 †Zygastrocarcinus
 †Zygastrocarcinus waagei

References

 

Mesozoic
Montana